Henry C. Matysek is a 1975 bronze sculpture depicting the former Williamson County sheriff of the same name by H. Clay Dahlberg, installed outside the Williamson County Courthouse, in Georgetown, Texas, United States.

Description
The bronze portrait bust depicts Matysek, a former Williamson County sheriff, wearing a cowboy hat, suit and tie, and a badge shaped like a star on his chest. The sculpture measures approximately 24 x 18 x 13 inches, and rests on a pink granite base that measures approximately 48 x 25 x 25 inches. A plaque on the base reads "IN MEMORY OF / HENRY C. MATYSEK / 1918–1974 / DEDICATED SHERIFF / OF WILLIAMSON COUNTY / 1954–1974 / SPONSORED BY THE / KIWANIS CLUB OF / GEORGETOWN ALONG WITH / THE FOLLOWING CONTRIBUTORS", followed by a list of names.

History
The bust was sponsored by the city's Kiwanis club. It was surveyed by the Smithsonian Institution's "Save Outdoor Sculpture!" program in 1995.

See also

 1975 in art

References

External links
 

1975 establishments in Texas
1975 sculptures
Bronze sculptures in Texas
Buildings and structures in Georgetown, Texas
Busts in Texas
Monuments and memorials in Texas
Outdoor sculptures in Texas
Sculptures of men in Texas